TVRI (also referred to as TVRI Nasional, TVRI Siaran Nasional, or Kanal 1 TVRI Nasional, formerly also known as TVRI Stasiun Pusat Jakarta) is the main national public television channel owned by LPP Televisi Republik Indonesia (TVRI). The channel began broadcasting on 24 August 1962, making it the first television station in Indonesia. The channel was also the only television channel choice in Indonesia until 1989, when Programa Dua TVRI (now TVRI Jakarta) in Jakarta broadcast separately from TVRI and private television stations began broadcasting.

TVRI is networked with regional TVRI stations on analog broadcasts (except Special Capital Region of Jakarta and its surroundings), but broadcasts fully and independent from regional stations on digital broadcasts. The channel is available on terrestrial (both analog and digital, with analog broadcast to be shut down in 2022), satellite, and most of pay television providers, as well as on TVRI Klik streaming service.

History

As a preparation towards the fourth Asian Games in 1962, the Indonesian government intends to establish a television station in Indonesia. On July 25, 1961, the Indonesian Minister of Information issued Ministerial Decree No. 20/SK/M/1961 regarding the formation of the Television Preparation Committee (P2T).

TVRI began its trial broadcast with the 17th Indonesian Independence Day ceremony on 17 August 1962. The event was broadcast from the courtyard of the Merdeka Palace in Jakarta, in black-and-white format and supported by a 100W backup transmitter. On 24 August, TVRI officially aired for the first time with a live broadcast of the 1962 Asian Games opening ceremony from Gelora Bung Karno Main Stadium.

After the concluding of the games, TVRI was closed for some time until it aired again on 11 October 1962. TVRI began broadcasting advertisements on television starting 1 March 1963.

In 1965 TVRI Yogyakarta was inaugurated in Yogyakarta, signalling the establishment of regional TVRI stations in following years which gradually expanded the reach of TVRI central broadcast. With the launch of Palapa satellite in 1976, TVRI could easily reach all parts of Indonesia. This is reinforced by the "mobile production station" (Stasiun Produksi Keliling) which was formed gradually starting in 1977 in several provincial capitals.

In the 1960s, TVRI only broadcast at the evening. Until 1969, TVRI only broadcast 4.5 hours on Sunday nights. However, in the following decades, TVRI added broadcast hours to the afternoon. The morning and afternoon broadcast is then presented only on Sundays, as well as on national holidays and state events.

On 1 January 1983, TVRI launched Programa Dua TVRI (now TVRI Jakarta) TVRI officially launched TVRI Programa 2 in Jakarta, which was originally a channel that only broadcast news programs in English. Starting in 1989, Programa 2 programs began to be developed to be more suitable for the Jakarta public, thus starting to undermine TVRI's central broadcast monopoly on television broadcasts.  which began to overturn TVRI monopoly on television broadcasts, followed by launch of private television network RCTI about four months later. On 23 January 1991, another private television network TPI (now MNCTV) began broadcasting nationally, initially by utilizing TVRI airtime which does not broadcast in the morning and afternoon. Since then TVRI is no longer dominates television broadcasts in other places in Indonesia. Moreover, the Minister of Information's decree allowed private television stations (which previously had their broadcast coverage limited to the city where the station was broadcasting) to broadcast nationally.

Starting from 16 November 1998, TVRI introduced the weekday morning broadcast from 05.30 WIB to 09.30 WIB; previously TVRI aired the morning broadcast only on Sunday, national holidays and state events. This airtime addition would continue until 12 July 2001, where TVRI began its full daytime broadcasts while continuing to close at night.

In 2004, TVRI relay TVE (currently TV Edukasi) on daytime, as a partnership between TVRI and the Ministry of National Education (currently Ministry of Education, Culture, Research, and Technology). The relay stopped in the early 2010s.

As the COVID-19 pandemic in Indonesia urging the government to appeal Indonesians to "work, study, and pray at home", the Ministry of Education and Culture renewed again its partnership with TVRI, this time to broadcast educational programming on a dedicated block on the TVRI network starting 13 April 2020 to 30 March 2021. Titled Belajar dari Rumah, the block consists of kids program Jalan Sesama for young children, instructional programming for elementary and high school students, and a parenting program on weekdays; as well as national movies at several weeknights and children, talkshow, and documentary programs at weekends.

Until early 2021, TVRI broadcasts roughly 20–21 hours a day from 4am to midnight WIB on the next day and 21.5 hours during the month of Ramadan, making TVRI one of the few national television networks that does not broadcast 24 hours a day. Starting mid-April 2021 (coinciding with the beginning of Ramadan), TVRI start broadcasting throughout the day for 24 hours, later by the end of the same month, TVRI now broadcasts in 16:9 (previously in 4:3).

Broadcast coverage 

As of 2022, TVRI has had 361 transmission stations (of which 129 are digital transmission stations), which are claimed to be able to reach up to 78.2% of Indonesian audiences. This makes TVRI a channel with the widest reach of any other television network in Indonesia. These transmission stations are managed by 32 regional TVRI stations throughout the country.

Programming 
TVRI broadcasts a variety of programming, ranging from news, information, entertainment, sports, to children programming for 24 hours a day.

Its current flagship news program is Klik Indonesia, aired four times a day in the morning, noon, afternoon, and the evening. Klik Indonesia is a continuation of TVRI's main news program that started in the 1960s, thus inherit the oldest news program in Indonesia. Other news programs include the world news program Dunia Dalam Berita, broadcast almost continuously since 1978, and English-language English News Service.

Past programs include the Indonesian legendary children programming Si Unyil, and Berpacu dalam Melodi game show (from 1988 until 1998).

Presenters

Current
 Ardianto Wijaya Kusuma
 Herdina Suherdi
 Lenny Hadiawati
 Oki Satrial (also hosts sports magazine events)
 Pamela Safdia
 Natasya Paruntu
 Adi priyatmoko
 Nurul Jamilah
 Fitria Herbiyanti
 Yoga Pratama
 Robitho Hamdani
 Sesko Satrio
 Lorenzo Mukuan (also hosts magazine events and live sports events)
 Jessy Wong
 Sophia Fanumbi Ongge
 Dewinta Kailola
 Muhhamad Robitho Hamdani
 Rizky Ikra Negara
 Norma Novicka
 Kamila Aswan (also hosts magazine shows and features)
 Nirma Ramadhania
 Maya Karim (also hosts sports magazine events)
 Happy Goeritman
 Iwan Chandra Lamisi
 Rahmat Idris
 Andin Wijaya (also hosts sports magazine events)
 Tengku Fajri
 Mar'atun Mardiyah
 Silkania Swarizona
 Anggi Dwijaya (also hosts magazine events and live sports events)
 Regina Valeria Putri (also hosts magazine events and live sports events)
 Anisa Larasati
 Intan Destia
 Vidya Franciska
 Yunita Monim 
 Imam Priyono
 Fristian Griec (Forum Fristian)

Former
 Sambas Mangundikarta (deceased)
 Aldi Hawari (now at RCTI, MNC News and BuddyKu)
 Hasan Ashari Oramahi
 Anita Rachman
 Dachri Oskandar
 Yan Partawidjaja
 Pangeran Siahaan
 Daniar Achri (now at CNN Indonesia, Trans7 and Trans TV)
 Hamdan Alkafie (now at MetroTV)
 Nurul Naila (now at MetroTV)
 Anastasia Praditha (now at Trans7 via the program Selebrita)
 Aiman Witjaksono (now at Kompas TV)
 Amie Ardhini (now at MetroTV)
 Frida Lidwina (now at CNN Indonesia, Trans7 and Trans TV) 
 Ishakkan (now at Jak TV)
 Sari Putri
 Febrizky Yahya
 Dwi Tunjungsari
 Gumilang Adiputra
 Erwin Dwinanto
 Justinus Lhaksana (now a commentator of Premier League)
 Rina Fahlevi 
 Theodorus Daniel
 Nining Supratmanto

See also 
 TVRI
 TVRI World
 TVRI Sport

References

External links 

TVRI
Television stations in Indonesia
Television channels and stations established in 1962
1962 establishments in Indonesia